Onicha Olona town is a town in the Aniocha North local government area of Delta State, Nigeria. It is the HQ of the former Onicha-Olona Kingdom, first ruled by Oba Ugbe, the brother of Oba Orhogbua (both brothers were sons of Oba Esigie of the ancient Benin Kingdom). Originally, it was ruled by the descendants of Oba Ugbe who reside in the present day Idumu-Ugbe Qtrs (Ugbe Royal Qtrs) before the arrival of the British.

Onicha Olona has been challenged with the efforts to solve its Obiship over the years.

Notable indigenes 
 Victor Ochei Former Speaker, Delta State House of Assembly
 Benedict Peters, CEO Aiteo Oil and Gas Inc

See also 
 Anioma people
 Organisation for the Advancement of Anioma Culture (OFAAC)
 Enuani dialect
 Ekumeku Movement

References 

Towns in Nigeria
Populated places in Delta State